Charles E. Dagit Jr. is a contemporary American architect, artist, writer and professor.  He is a Fellow of the American Institute of Architects residing in suburban Philadelphia, Pennsylvania, USA.

Dagit has taught architectural design for 40 years at Temple University, and Drexel University, and has been a visiting critic and lecturer at the University of Pennsylvania, Cornell University, Carnegie Mellon University, and Syracuse University.

In 2012 the American Institute of Architects (AIA) Pennsylvania presented Charles Dagit with its highest honor, the Gold Medal of Distinction for his career achievements in architecture. Only three other Philadelphia Design Architects have ever received this award; Robert Venturi, Peter Bohlin, and Vincent Kling. The AIA’s Philadelphia chapter also honored Dagit in 2012 with the prestigious Thomas U. Walter Award for a lifetime of achievement in design excellence, dedication as a teaching professor, and for his committed service to the AIA over four decades.
In 2013 his first book was published, Louis I. Kahn Architect - Remembering the Man and Those Who Surrounded Him.

Early life and education 

Dagit was born in Philadelphia, Pennsylvania and was raised in a family of architects.  His grandfather had founded a prominent architectural firm in 1888, Henry D. Dagit & Sons, known best for Catholic Churches in the eastern United States, and his father and uncles were architects at the firm.
Dagit studied in the Louis I. Kahn Masters Studio in architecture, earning a Masters in Architecture in 1968, at the University of Pennsylvania. In Philadelphia in the 1960s, Louis I. Kahn’s Masters Studio was the hub for what became known as "The Philadelphia School".  The philosophies and design of Louis Kahn, Robert Venturi, Aldo Giurgola, and other members of this group were influential in Dagit’s professional development.

Architecture 

In 1970 he founded Dagit•Saylor Architects and won over 60 Design Awards including the Gold and Silver Medals for design from AIA Pennsylvania and AIA Philadelphia. In 1976 Robert A.M. Stern named him one of the “40 Under 40 American Architects” in A+U Magazine.  1983 he was elevated to the College of Fellows of the American Institute of Architects, the youngest architect to that time to be honored as an AIA Fellow. Dagit’s work has been published in international design magazines including; Architectural Record, L’Architecture d’Aujourd’Hui, The Japan Architect, L’Industria delle Construzioni, and many others.

Charles Dagit has provided leadership in the AIA National Committee on Design (COD) for over 3 decades, chairing the National Awards Task Group and the Gold Medal Task Group. He served as Chairman of the Committee in 1994. He chaired the AIA COD National Design Conference in 1991, with a focus on “The Philadelphia School”.  Dagit has also served on the Boards of both the AIA Pennsylvania and Philadelphia, and was President of AIA Philadelphia in 1991.

Select projects

College buildings

Beloit College, Logan Museum of Anthropology, 1993–95
Cornell University
Appel Commons Building (2000)
North Campus Residential Initiative Plan
Haverford College, Whitehead Campus Center, 1990  
Lehigh University, Zoellner Performing Arts Center, 1997
Pennsylvania State University
Physical Education Building
Agricultural Arena
Shippensburg University
Grove Hall, College of Business
Cumberland Union Building
Swarthmore College, Lang Performing Arts Center, 1991
Ursinus College
F.W. Olin Hall
Berman Museum of Art, 1989

Other buildings
Samuel M.V. Hamilton Building, Pennsylvania Academy of the Fine Arts, 2005
Monastery of St. Clare
Pennsylvania Ballet

Awards and honors 

The Medal of Distinction, Gold Medal, AIA Pennsylvania 2012
The Thomas U. Walter Award, AIA Philadelphia 2012
Silver Medal of the Pennsylvania Society of Architects, 1985
National Design Competition Winner, Cultural Arts Pavilion in Newport News, Virginia, 1984
College of Fellows, Design, AIA, 1983
World Contemporary Architecture Survey, The Japan Architect, 1976
"40 Under 40" American Architects, A+U Magazine, 1976
Gold Medal of the Philadelphia Chapter, AIA, 1976
Silver Medal of the Philadelphia Chapter, AIA, 1975
Shenck-Woodman Traveling Fellowship, 1968
John Stewardson Memorial Traveling Fellowship, 1967
James Smyth Warner Prize, 1967
Dales Traveling Fellowship, 1966

Books 
The Groundbreakers: Architects in American History - Their Places and Times, Dagit, 2015 
Louis I. Kahn Architect: Remembering the Man and Those who Surrounded Him, Dagit, 2013

References

External links 

 University of Pennsylvania lecture, 30 October 2013 

Living people
21st-century American architects
Architects from Philadelphia
Fellows of the American Institute of Architects
American theatre architects
American architectural historians
American architecture writers
American male non-fiction writers
21st-century American historians
University of Pennsylvania School of Design alumni
21st-century American painters
21st-century male artists
Painters from Pennsylvania
20th-century American architects
20th-century American painters
American male painters
Temple University faculty
Drexel University faculty
University of Pennsylvania faculty
Cornell University faculty
Carnegie Mellon University faculty
Syracuse University faculty
1943 births
Historians from Pennsylvania